František Xaver Pokorný (20 December 1729, Městec Králové – 2 July 1794, Regensburg) was a Czech classical period composer and violinist.

While young, he left his hometown for Regensburg where he studied violin playing with Joseph Riepel. In 1750 he went to Wallerstein where he played violin in the Oettingen-Wallerstein court orchestra. In 1753 he went to Mannheim where he further studied with Johann Stamitz and Ignaz Holzbauer among others. After the death of Philip Charles Domenic Oettingen-Wallerstein in 1766 he asked for permission to leave the court for three to four years. He spent the last part of his life in the orchestra of Karl Anselm, 4th Prince of Thurn and Taxis, again in Regensburg.

Nearly 150 symphonies are attributed to him, but his authorship is disputed for more than fifty of them since after his death his surname was erased from his works and replaced by names of other authors by intendant of the Regensburg orchestra Theodor von Schacht. Furthermore, many works for wind instruments, tens of solo concertos including 45 for harpsichord and 3 for two horns are attributed to him.

External links

1729 births
1794 deaths
18th-century classical composers
18th-century male musicians
18th-century Bohemian musicians
Czech Classical-period composers
Czech male classical composers
People from Městec Králové
Pupils of Johann Stamitz